Ilchigulovo (İlseğol) is a rural locality (a village) and the administrative centre of Ilchigulovsky Selsoviet, Uchalinsky District, Bashkortostan, Russia. The population was 242 as of 2010. There are 5 streets.

Geography 
Ilchigulovo is located 66 km northeast of Uchaly (the district's administrative centre) by road. Orlovka is the nearest rural locality.

References 

Rural localities in Uchalinsky District